The 1992 Kentucky Wildcats football team represented the University of Kentucky in the Southeastern Conference (SEC) during the 1992 NCAA Division I-A football season.  In their third season under head coach Bill Curry, the Wildcats compiled a 4–7 record (2–6 against SEC opponents), finished in fifth place in the Eastern Division of the SEC, and were outscored by their opponents, 280 to 207.  The team played its home games in Commonwealth Stadium in Lexington, Kentucky.

The team's statistical leaders included Pookie Jones with 1,434 passing yards, Terry Samuels with 380 rushing yards, and Tim Calvert with 330 receiving yards.

Schedule

Personnel

References

Kentucky
Kentucky Wildcats football seasons
Kentucky Wildcats football